A penumbral lunar eclipse took place on Friday, July 26, 1991, the third of four lunar eclipses in 1991. This was the 2nd member of Lunar Saros 148. The previous event was on 15 July 1973, and the 1st eclipse of the series. The next event will be on 6 August 2009.

Visibility

Relations to other lunar eclipses

Eclipses of 1991 
 An annular solar eclipse on January 15.
 A penumbral lunar eclipse on January 30.
 A penumbral lunar eclipse on June 27.
 A total solar eclipse on July 11.
 A penumbral lunar eclipse on July 26.
 A partial lunar eclipse on December 21.

Saros series 
This eclipse is part of Saros cycle series 148.

Lunar year series

Half-Saros cycle
A lunar eclipse will be preceded and followed by solar eclipses by 9 years and 5.5 days (a half saros). This lunar eclipse is related to two partial solar eclipses of Solar Saros 155.

See also 
List of lunar eclipses
List of 20th-century lunar eclipses

Notes

External links 
 

1991-07
1991 in science
July 1991 events